Sng, or SNG, may refer to:

People
Joel Sng (b.1983), an entrepreneur and businessman from Singapore
Junie Sng (b.1964), a swimmer from Singapore
Kelvin Sng (b.1974), film director from Singapore
Larry Sng (b.1979), a politician from Malaysia
Sng Boh Khim (1950–2006), a poet from Singapore
Sng Ju Wei (b.1980), a swimmer from Singapore

Other uses
Satellite news gathering
Single negative metamaterial, with negative permittivity or permeability
LNER Class A4 4498 Sir Nigel Gresley, a British steam locomotive 
Sit and go poker tournament
Slovak National Gallery (Slovenská národná galéria)
SNG, the IATA code for Capitán Av. Juan Cochamanidis Airport in the Santa Cruz Department of Bolivia
sng, the ISO 639-3 code for the Luba-Sanga language spoken in the Democratic Republic of Congo
SNG, the National Rail code for Sunningdale railway station in the county of Berkshire, UK
Sodruzhestvo Nezavisimykh Gosudarstv, the Commonwealth of Independent States in transliterated Russian
Sprinter New Generation, the new local rolling stock for Nederlandse Spoorwegen
Substitute natural gas, also known as synthetic natural gas
Sylloge Nummorum Graecorum, a project to publish ancient Greek coinage
Singapore, a sovereign island country and city-state in maritime Southeast Asia

See also